John Henry Lahr (born July 12, 1941) is an American theater critic and writer. From 1992 to 2013, he was a staff writer and the senior drama critic at The New Yorker. He has written more than twenty books related to theater. Lahr has been called "one of the greatest biographers writing today".

Early life
Lahr was born in Los Angeles, California to a Jewish family. He is the son of Mildred "Millie" Schroeder, a Ziegfeld girl, and Bert Lahr, an actor and comedian most famous for portraying the Cowardly Lion in The Wizard of Oz. When his father left movies for the stage, the family moved from their home in Coldwater Canyon to Manhattan.

Until his father was on the cover of Time magazine when Lahr was in grade school, he did not know what his father did for a living. Lahr wrote:On stage, Dad was sensational; in private he was sensationally taciturn: a brooding absent presence, to be encountered mostly in his bedroom chair at his desk, turned away from us, with his blue Sulka bathrobe knotted under his pot belly. The Bert Lahr my sister and I call "Dad" is the ravishing performer, not the indifferent parent. We loved him; we just couldn't reach him. The public got his best self—inspired, full of prowess—the family got the rest. At home, Dad was depressed, bewildered, hidden; in front of the paying customers, however, he was buoyant and truthful—a bellowing, cavorting genius who could reduce audiences to a level of glee so intense that from the wings I once saw a man stuff a handkerchief in his mouth to stop laughing.However, Lahr did spend a lot of time with his father at theaters playing with props and costumes. His childhood was also filled with access to Hollywood and Vaudeville celebrities who were his father's friends, such as Eddie Foy Jr., Buster Keaton, Groucho Marx, and Ethel Merman.

Lahr received a B.A. from Yale University. While there, he was a member of the literary fraternity of St. Anthony Hall and was an editor of the Yale Daily News. He also has a master's degree from Worcester College, Oxford University.

Career

Theater 
Lahr started his career managing theaters. In 1968, he was a literary adviser to the Guthrie Theatre in Minneapolis, Minnesota. He was an advisor to the Vivian Beaumont Theatre in Manhattan, New York from 1969 to 1971. He also was a literary consultant for the Lincoln Center's Repertory Theater in the 1970s.

He has adapted several books for the stage; these plays were performed at the Royal National Theatre in London, the Mark Taper Forum in Los Angeles, the Royal Exchange in Manchester, and in the West End of London.

In 2002, he co-wrote Elaine Stritch's one-woman show Elaine Stritch at Liberty. He and Stritch won a Tony Award and the Drama Desk Award for Outstanding Book of a Musical for the show. However, Lahr sued Strich, claiming she "cheated him of profits" from the play.

Critic and writer 
Lahr became a contributing editor to Evergreen Review in 1967. At the same time, he was a freelance theater critic for The Village Voice and as a general theater editor for Grove Press. He has also written for British Vogue, BroadwayWorld, the Daily Mail, Esquire, The Guardian, The Nation, The New Indian Express, The New Republic, The New York Times, The Paris Review, Slate, and The Telegraph.

In 1992, when he was fifty years old, Lahr became a staff writer and a senior drama critic at The New Yorker magazine. He wrote profiles, reviews, and behind-the-scenes portraits. He also began reviewing regional and international theater, expanding the magazine's coverage beyond Broadway for the first time. His profiles are biographies consisting of 8,000 to 10,000 words. Each article takes him three to four months to write and research. Throughout his time at The New Yorker, Lahr profiled more than forty actors, including Woody Allen, Roseanne Barr, Ingmar Bergman, Cate Blanchett, Judi Dench, Bob Hope, Eddie Izzard, Tony Kushner, David Mamet, Arthur Miller, Helen Mirren, Mira Nair, Mike Nichols, and Al Pacino. One unique aspect of a profile by him is that "Lahr typically receives more access to his subjects than they've ever allowed before. Just as he wants to write about them, they want to be written about in his magazine." For example, Sean Penn gave his mother's telephone number to Lahr.

In 2000, his compilation book, Show and Tell: New Yorker Profiles, included a profile of his mother who was a Ziegfeld Follies girl. Lahr's most recent book,  Joy Ride: Show People and Their Shows in the US (2015), is a collection of his New Yorker profiles on playwrights and directors, as well as some of his reviews of their work.

He retired from The New Yorker in 2013. His 21-year stint is the longest in the magazine's history. He is currently a chief theater critic emeritus of The New Yorker and writes two profiles a year.

Film 
In 1987, Lahr co-produced Prick Up Your Ears, a film version of his 1978 book about a British playwright, Prick Up Your Ears: The Biography of Joe Orton. Lahr was portrayed in the film by Wallace Shawn.

Lahr has also written movie scripts, including the short film Sticky My Fingers...Fleet My Feet which was nominated for a 1971 Academy Award for Best Short Subject, Live Action Subjects.

Author 
When Lahr was 21 years old, he decided to connect to his father by writing a biography. Eight years later, he finished the biography called Notes on a Cowardly Lion, the week before his father died. Since then, he has written many other books, including the novels and biographies of theatrical figures. His biographies include the Australian comedian Barry Humphries, Joe Orton, and Frank Sinatra.

In 1994, Lahr published an expose in The New Yorker detailing the behavior of Lady Maria St. Just, the literary executor of playwright Tennessee Williams's estate. Lahr's profile helped Lyle Leverich publish Tom: The Unknown Tennessee Williams after "a five-year legal stranglehold" by St. Just. In 2000, Leverich died while working on a planned second volume about Williams, and named Lahr as his successor in this project; Lahr agreed to complete book, covering Williams from 1945 to his death in 1983.

Lahr's stand-alone biography, Tennessee Williams: Mad Pilgrimage of the Flesh, was published in 2014. In the United States, the biography won the National Book Critics Circle Award, the American Academy of Arts and Letters Vursell Award, and the Lambda Literary Award for the best gay biography. In the United Kingdom, it won the 2015 Sheridan Morley Prize for Theatre Biography.

Awards 

 Harold D. Vursell Memorial Award, American Academy of Arts and Letters (2015)
 Sheridan Morley Prize for Theatre Biography – Tennessee Williams: Mad Pilgrimage of the Flesh (2015)
 Lambda Literary Award for Gay Memoir/Biography – Tennessee Williams: Mad Pilgrimage of the Flesh (2014)
 National Book Award Finalist, National Book Foundation – Tennessee Williams: Mad Pilgrimage of the Flesh (2014)
 National Book Critics Circle Award – Tennessee Williams: Mad Pilgrimage of the Flesh (2014)
 Tony Award for Special Theatrical Event – Elaine Stritch at Liberty (2002)
 Drama Desk Award for Outstanding Book of a Musical  – Elaine Stritch at Liberty (2002)
 ASCAP Deems Taylor Award for Writers, Editors, Publishers — for his work for The New Yorker (1998)
 ASCAP Deems Taylor Award for Writers, Editors, Publishers — for Sinatra's Song (1997)
 George Jean Nathan Award for Dramatic Criticism – for reviews in The New Yorker (1993–1994)
 Roger Machell Prize for the best book on the performing arts – Dame Edna Everage and the Rise of Western Civilization (1992)
 ASCAP Deems Taylor Award for Writers, Editors, Publishers — for his work with The New Republic (1982)
 George Jean Nathan Award for Dramatic Criticism – for "In Search of a New Mythology", Evergreen Review, January 1969 and reviews in The Village Voice (1968–1968)
 The National Arts Club Medal of Honor for Achievement in Theatre
 Yale writing prize
 American Film Institute Award
 The Wall Street Journal Fellowship

Personal life 
In July 1965, Lahr became engaged to Anthea Mander of Wightwick Manor in Wolverhampton who he met while they both were attending Oxford University. She was the daughter of the Liberal politician, art patron and industrialist Sir Geoffrey Mander. They married on August 12, 1965, at St. Peter's Church in Eaton Square, London. They also had a second wedding in New York City for Lahr's parents who were unable to travel to England. After their marriage, they lived in New York City. They had a son named Christopher.

Lahr moved to London in 1973. While he was still working for The New Yorker, he divided his time between the two cities, spending two weeks in New York City a month, returning home to London for the rest of the month. Rather than maintaining a residence in New York, he rented the maid's room of producer Margo Lion's apartment.

In 1988, Lahr began a relationship with New York-born ex-pat actress Connie Booth, co-writer and a cast member of Fawlty Towers and ex-wife of John Cleese. Lahr and Booth lived together for fifteen years before marrying 2000. They live in Highgate in north London.

Lahr contributed to John Kerry's presidential campaign and Democratic organizations. His sister is the editor and writer Jane Lahr.

Publications

Books

Biographies and profiles 

 Notes on the Cowardly Lion (Knopf, 1970) 
 The Business of Rainbows: The Life and Lyrics of E.Y. Harburg (Holt, Rinehart, and Winston, 1978) 
 Prick Up Your Ears: The Biography of Joe Orton (Lane, 1978) 
 Coward the Playwright (University of California Press, 1983) 
 Dame Edna Everage and the Rise of Western Civilization: Backstage with Barry Humphries (Bloomsbury, 1991) 
 Sinatra: The Artist and the Man (Random House, 1997) 
 Show and Tell: New Yorker Profiles (Overlook Press, 2000) 
 Honky Tonk Parade: New Yorker Profiles of Show People (Overlook Press, 2005) 
 Tennessee Williams: Mad Pilgrimage of the Flesh (W. W. Norton & Company, 2014) 
 Joy Ride: Show People and Their Shows (W. W. Norton & Company, 2015) 
 Arthur Miller: American Witness (Yale University Press, 2022)

Collected criticism 
 Up Against the Fourth Wall (Grove Press, 1970) 
 A Casebook on Harold Pinter's "The Homecoming" (Grove Press, 1971) 
 Acting Out America: Essays on Modern Theater (Penguin, 1972) 
 Astonish Me: Adventures in Contemporary Theater (Viking 1973) 
 Life Show: How to See Theater in Life and Life in Theater (Viking, 1973, with Jonathan Price 
 Automatic Vaudeville: Essays on Star Turns (Knopf, 1984) 
 Light Fantastic: Adventures in Theatre (Bloomsbury, 1997)

Fiction 
 The Autograph Hound (Knopf, 1972) 
 Hot to Trot (Knopf, 1974)

As editor 
 Plays from the Eugene O'Neill Foundation (Grove Press, 1970) 
 The Orton Diaries (HarperCollins, 1986) 
 The Diaries of Kenneth Tynan (Bloomsbury, 2002) 
 Gem of the Ocean ( Theatre Communications Group, 2003)

Plays and film adaptations 
 Sticky My Fingers...Fleet My Feet  (1969)
 Diary of a Somebody (Limelight Editions, 1989) 
 The Manchurian Candidate (Dramatist Play Service, 1993) 
 Accidental Death of an Anarchist
 The Bluebird of Unhappiness: A Woody Allen Revue
 Keys to the Kingdom (2019)
 Elaine Strich at Liberty (2002)

Essays and reporting 

 Lahr, John. (January 1969) "In Search of a New Mythology", Evergreen Review, No. 62.
 — (Summer 1969) "Jules Feiffer: Interviewed by John Lahr.: The Transatlantic Review, 32: 38–47.
 — (November 24, 2008). "Land of Lost Souls". The Critics. Life and Letters. The New Yorker. 84 (38): 114–120.
 
 — (November 15, 2010). "Angels on the Verge". The Critics. The Theatre. The New Yorker. 86 (36). Retrieved April 30, 2012.
 —  (March 14, 2011). "Losers Take All". The Critics. The Theatre. The New Yorker. 87 (4): 62–64. 
 — (April 4, 2011). "God Squad". The Critics. The Theatre. The New Yorker. 87 (7): 76–77. Retrieved October 7, 2014. 
 — (November 7, 2011). "The Natural". Backstage Chronicles. The New Yorker. 87 (35): 31–37. Retrieved March 28, 2014.
 — (January 30, 2012). "Boldfaced Bard". The Critics. The Theatre. The New Yorker. 87 (46): 68–70.
 — (February 13–20, 2012). "A Talent to Abuse". The Critics. The Theatre. The New Yorker. 88 (1): 118–119. 
 — (November 19, 2012). "Supersize". The Critics. The Theatre. The New Yorker. 88 (36): 94–95. Retrieved 2014-11-04.
 — (November 26, 2012). "Unhappy Families". The Critics. The Theatre. The New Yorker. 88 (37): 84–85.
 — (February 25, 2013). "Songs of Angry Men". The Talk of the Town. Credit Due Dept. The New Yorker. 89 (2): 26–27.
 — (March 31, 2014). "Joy ride: Susan Stroman puts 'Bullets over Broadway' on Broadway". Profiles. The New Yorker. 90 (6): 50–59.
 — (July 21, 2014) "A Last Lunch with Mike Nichols". Culture Desk. The New Yorker.
 — (September 15, 2014) "Caught in the Act: What Drives Al Pacino" Profiles. The New Yorker. 90 (27): 58
 — (November 24, 2014) "Poster Boy" The Boards. The New Yorker.
 — (September 21, 2015) "Julianne Moore, Beauty and the Beast". The New Yorker
 — (October 24, 2016) "The Dynamism of Janet McTeer." The New Yorker.
 — (December 19–26, 2016). "Act of Grace : Viola Davis Aims to Alter How African-Americans Are Seen". Profiles. The New Yorker. 92 (42): 52–64.
 — (July 31, 2017) "Postscript: Sam Shepard Who Brought Rage and Rebellion Onstage". The New Yorker.
 — (July 19, 2018) "Squealing to Survive", London Review of Books, 40 (14): 33–35.
 — (September 8, 2014) "When He Acted it was Like Jazz". Daily Telegraph (London).
 — (September 24, 2018) "Sam Mendes's Directional Discoveries". Profiles. The New Yorker.
 — (November 19, 2019) "Todd Haynes Rewrites the Hollywood Playbook". Profiles. The New Yorker.
 — (September 20, 2020). "The Many Faces of Ethan Hawke". Profiles. The New Yorker.

References

1941 births
Living people
Lahr family
People from Los Angeles
Yale University alumni
St. Anthony Hall
American biographers
American people of German-Jewish descent
Alumni of Worcester College, Oxford
American expatriates in England
The New Yorker critics
American theater critics
Drama Desk Award winners
Lambda Literary Award winners
The New Yorker people
Tony Award winners
Writers from Los Angeles